Anton Rippon (born 20 December 1944) is a British award-winning newspaper columnist, journalist, author and publisher.

He was born in Derby and grew up there. He has spent almost all his working life in the newspaper and publishing industry including working as a reporter for the Derby Evening Telegraph and as a feature writer for the Nottingham Evening Post. He was a football writer for the Sunday Telegraph and editor of the Footballer Magazine. He also edited the Sports Journalists' Association of Great Britain Year Book.

He is the author of more than 40 books, on sport and wartime history, and including an autobiographical memoir A Derby Boy, which was published in 2007. His work has appeared in a wide range of national newspapers and magazines including The Guardian, The Times and The Independent and he has written radio documentaries for the BBC. He has appeared on BBC TV, ITV and Sky Sports.

In 1982, he founded Breedon Books, the sports and history publisher that he sold in 2003 to resume writing full-time. In 1993, the Derby County Former Professional Players' Association elected him an honorary member, and in 2015 named him as the recipient of its annual merit award for services to the club. He is also a member of the Sports Journalists' Association, the International Society of Olympic Historians and the Football Writers' Association. His book Gunter Plüschow: Airman, Escaper, Explorer, was published by Pen & Sword in 2009. A collection of his columns from the Derby Telegraph – A Derby View – was published by Wharncliffe in October 2010.

His forebears include Major Sir Richard Whieldon Barnett MP, who represented Great Britain at rifle shooting in the 1908 Olympic Games; Thomas Whieldon, the respected potter and business partner of Josiah Wedgwood.

In 2016 the University of Derby awarded him an honorary master's degree for services to journalism.

Rippon was named Newspaper Columnist of the Year in the 2017 Midlands Media Awards.

He is a judge for the British Sports Journalism Awards, and the Midlands Media Student Awards.

In April 2019, Rippon ended the column that he had written every week in the Derby (Evening)Telegraph for the past 20 years (over 1,000 in all) as well as the Derby County column that he had written for the past 10 years. He also covered news stories for the paper, and news features on subjects such as the work of Macmillan Cancer nurses, and the NHS contaminated blood scandal.

Rippon then signed a deal with Pen & Sword Publishers. His Britain 1940: The Decisive Year on the Home Front was published in March 2020. Books on Liverpool FC and Arsenal FC followed.

During the 2020-21 Covid-19 pandemic, he rejoined the Derby Telegraph, writing a column initially entitled 'Anton in Lockdown', and again contributing feature articles.

Selected bibliography

2014 How Britain Kept Calm and Carried On: True stories from the Home Front, Michael O'Mara 
Gunter Plüschow: Airman, Escaper, Explorer, Pen & Sword, 2009,  
https://www.pen-and-sword.co.uk/Britain-1940-Hardback/p/17296

References

Living people
1944 births
British male journalists
British memoirists
People from Derby